The Forouhi–Bloomer model is a mathematical formula for the frequency dependence of the complex-valued refractive index. The model can be used to fit the refractive index of amorphous and crystalline semiconductor and dielectric materials at energies near and greater than their optical band gap. The dispersion relation bears the names of Rahim Forouhi and Iris Bloomer, who created the model and interpreted the physical significance of its parameters. The model is aphysical due to its incorrect asymptotic behavior and non-Hermitian character. These shortcomings inspired modified versions of the model as well as development of the Tauc–Lorentz model.

Mathematical formulation 
The complex refractive index is given by

 

where
  is the real component of the complex refractive index, commonly called the refractive index,
  is the imaginary component of the complex refractive index, commonly called the extinction coefficient,
  is the photon energy (related to the angular frequency by ).

The real and imaginary components of the refractive index are related to one another through the Kramers-Kronig relations. The formula and complementary Kramers–Kronig integral are given by

 
 

where
  is the bandgap of the material,
  denotes the Cauchy principal value,
 .

Evaluating the Kramers-Kronig integral,

 
where
 ,
 ,
 .

The Forouhi–Bloomer model for crystalline materials is similar to that of amorphous materials.
 .
 .
where all variables are defined similarly to the amorphous case, but with unique values for each value of the summation index . Thus, the model for amorphous materials is a special case of the model for crystalline materials when the sum is over a single term only.

References

See also 
 Cauchy equation
 Sellmeier equation
 Lorentz oscillator model
 Tauc–Lorentz model
 Brendel–Bormann oscillator model

Condensed matter physics
Electric and magnetic fields in matter
Optics